Boussemghoun (Arabic: بوسمغون) is a municipality in El Bayadh Province, Algeria. It is co-extensive with the district of Boussemghoun, and has a population of 2,480 which gives it 7 seats in the PMA. Its postal code is 32320 and its municipal code is 3213.

The people of Boussemghoun speak a Berber dialect, locally termed "Chelha" or "Tachelhit"; as of 2004, this remained in regular use, in contrast with some neighbouring villages where the use of Berber is reported to be declining.  The oasis is a centre of the Tijaniyyah order, which was founded there by Sidi Ahmad al-Tijani in 1782; it has a Tijaniyyah zaouia.

The earliest known historical mention of Boussemghoun is by Ibn Khaldun, in reference to a raid in 1370.

References

Communes of El Bayadh Province